Pope Matthew IV of Alexandria (Anba Matta El-Meeri), 102nd Pope of Alexandria & Patriarch of the See of St. Mark.

A monk
He was originally from Meer, hence the name Elmeeri, and  joined the Paromeos Monastery in the Nitrian Desert before becoming a Pope.

A Pope
On his first day as a Coptic Pope he transferred the  Seat of the Coptic Orthodox Pope of Alexandria from Church of the Virgin Mary (Haret Zuweila) to Saint Mary Church (Haret Elroum). and it stayed there till 1800 A.D. (1516–1517 A.M.) when Pope Mark VIII transferred it to Saint Mark's Coptic Orthodox Cathedral (Azbakeya).

References

17th-century Coptic Orthodox popes of Alexandria
1675 deaths